Francisco Manuel Moreno (born Monterrey, 13 August 1950) is a retired Mexican Anglican bishop. He is married to Esperanza and they have three children and three grandchildren.

Biography
Moreno was raised as a Roman Catholic but converted to the Anglican Church of Mexico when he was eight.
 
He studied for the ministry at the San Andrés Seminary in Mexico City, being ordained a deacon in 1972 and a priest in 1974, for the Diocese of Northern Mexico.

He was bishop of Northern Mexico, from 5 March 2010 to November 2020. In 2013 he was elected Archbishop and Primate of the Anglican Church of Mexico at their 7th General Synod on 14 June 2013, with his installation taking place two days later. He retired effective 13 November 2020.

He is seen as a moderate in the context of the current divisions of the Anglican Communion, being friendly with the liberal pro-LGBT provinces, but still opposing civil same-sex marriages and the religious blessing of same-sex unions as the official policy of the province.

References

External links
Primates of the Anglican Communion - Archbishop of Mexico, Anglican Ink, 3 January 2016

1950 births
Living people
Converts to Anglicanism from Roman Catholicism
Clergy from Monterrey
21st-century Anglican bishops in Mexico
21st-century Anglican archbishops
Anglican archbishops of Mexico
Anglican bishops of Northern Mexico